Cubitus is a Franco-Belgian comics series, and the basis for the Wowser cartoon series appearing in the United States. Cubitus was created by the Belgian cartoonist Dupa, and features Cubitus, a large anthropomorphic dog, who lives with his owner Semaphore. Cubitus is known as Dommel in Flanders and the Netherlands, Muppelo or Pom Pom in Finland, Teodoro in Italy and Доммель in Russia. His name derives from the old anatomical name of the ulna bone, supposedly derived from the Greek kybiton (elbow).

Synopsis
The series tells the story of Cubitus, a good-natured large, white dog endowed with speech. He lives in a house in the suburbs with his master, Sémaphore, a retired sailor, next door to Sénéchal, the black and white cat who is Cubitus' nemesis.

A vast majority of the album publications collect single page gags, but a few gather collections of shorter stories or, in rare cases, one long story throughout the entire album. Some of the single gag albums or short story compilations are thematic, with for instance in "Cubitus illustre ses ancêtres" revisiting history of humankind, "L'ami ne fait pas le moine" being pastiches of fellow authors from Tintin magazine or Les enquêtes de l'inspecteur Cubitus where he is a fictional police inspector.

Characters
Cubitus: Hero of the series, he is a white dog with a large belly, a black snout and yellow tail. Initially a dog with hair covering the eyes, Cubitus ended up becoming still more anthropomorphic. Nearly entirely human in behaviour, he walks on two legs, has hands instead of paws, and is able to perform any human action, although he retains his canine love of bones.
Sémaphore: A retired sailor who is the "Master" of Cubitus, even if sometimes the relationship of master and dog can be reversed. In the series, Semaphore's role is mainly to create inventions that are intended to be functional and aid his friends, but in the end lead to trouble.
Sénéchal: A black and white cat, close neighbour and Cubitus' worst natural enemy. In longer stories he may be Cubitus' ally.
Ventenpoupe: an old friend of Semaphore, and a swindler.

Side characters
Manuel de Cotalos Y Mucho Gusto, the ghost of Semaphore's improbable Sidecar outfit' pannier.

Publication history
Cubitus first appeared in the Franco-Belgian comics magazine Tintin on April 16, 1968. The series gained immediate popularity, and began album publication in 1972. After several years of gags and album publications, it became the title strip for a magazine of its own. The first publication of Cubitus was published by Le Lombard in December 1989, though it proved short-lived, lasting only six issues.

In 2005, the series was relaunched by Pierre Aucaigne (scenarist), and Michel Rodrigue (artist) under the title Les nouvelles aventures de Cubitus.

Bibliography

Dupa albums

 Du meilleur tonneau (1972)
 Un oscar pour Cubitus (1973)
 3e service (1974)
 Tout en caressant Cubitus (1975)
 Chien sans souci (1976)
 Alerte au pédalosaure (1977)
 Cubitus illustre ses ancêtres (1977)
 La corrida des hippopotames casqués (1979)
 Pour les intimes (1980)
 Heureux qui, comme Cubitus (1981)
 Raconte-moi, Cubitus (1982)
 Tu le fais exprès ou quoi? (1983)
 L'ami ne fait pas le moine (1984)
 Cubitus et la boîte qui parle (1984)
 Cubitus, tu nous fais marcher (1985)
 Cubitus, chien fidèle (1986)
 Cubitus, pas de salades (1986)
 Cubitus, est-ce bien sérieux? (1987)
 Cubitus, quand tu nous tiens!... (1988)
 Cubitus, remets-nous ça (1989)
 Toujours avec deux sucres (1989)
 L'esprit égaré (1989)
 Les enquêtes de l'inspecteur Cubitus (1990)
 Cubitus, donne la belle papatte (1990)
 Tout ça c'est des histoires (1991)
 Cubitus, chien sans accroc (1991)
 Cubitus se met au vert (1992)
 Chat, ch'est du chien! (1992)
 Copain toutes catégories (1993)
 Cubitus fait toujours le beau (1993)
 Cubitus, au poil près (1994)
 Cubitus et les cumulus de Romulus (1994)
 Cubitus mon chien quotidien (1995)
 Un bouquet garni pour Cubitus (1996)
 Chien indispensable (1997)
 L'héritage du Pastaga (1998)
 Cubitus ne mord jamais (1999)
 Si tous les gags du monde... (2000)
 Cubitus, ça n'arrive qu'à toi!... (2001)
 Tu te la coules douce... (2002)

Les Nouvelles Aventures de Cubitus
 En avant toute !! (2005)
 Un chien peut en cacher un autre (2006)
 En haut de la vague ! (2007)
 Tous des héros ! (2008)
 La Truffe dans le Guidon! (2009)
 Mon chien à moi ! (2010)
 Le chat du radin (2012)
 La guerre des boulons (2013)
 L'école des chiens (2014)
 Cubitus a tout inventé ! (2015)
 Super-héros! (2016)
 Vu à la télé (2017)

Short films
In 1977, the strip was adapted into an animated short film by the Belgian studio Belvision.

Anime

In 1988, the strip was adapted into a Japanese cartoon series named Don Don Domeru to Ron,  which was re-titled as Wowser for US audiences. Dubbed by Saban Entertainment, it is the only part of Cubitus that has been translated into English.

Impact

 Cubitus and Sénéchal appear on ten self-adhesive stamps launched by the French Poste in September 2006.
 A statue of Cubitus, by Yves Cauwenberghs, was erected on 3 October 2002 at Limal, where Dupa spent the last 30 years of his life.
 A mural painting of Cubitus can be seen in Brussels.

Sources

 Cubitus publications in Belgian Tintin and French Tintin BDoubliées 
 List of albums on Bedetheque.com 
 Cubitus profile on Hyphen comics
 https://web.archive.org/web/20080628212141/http://www.bdparadisio.com/scripts/detail.cfm?Id=290

Footnotes

External links
 Cubitus on Le Lombard 
 Cubitus fan site 

Belgian comic strips
Comics characters introduced in 1968
Lombard Editions titles
Fictional dogs
Comics about dogs
Bandes dessinées
1968 comics debuts
Gag-a-day comics
Humor comics
Surreal comedy
Fictional Belgian people
Belgian comics characters
Male characters in comics
Anthropomorphic dogs
Comics adapted into animated series
Comics adapted into television series
Metafictional comics